In genetics, a kissing stem-loop, or kissing stem loop interaction, is formed in ribonucleic acid (RNA) when two bases between two hairpin loops pair. These intra- and intermolecular kissing interactions are important in forming the tertiary or quaternary structure of many RNAs.

RNA kissing interactions, also called loop-loop pseudoknots, occur when the unpaired nucleotides in one hairpin loop, base pair with the unpaired nucleotides in another hairpin loop. When the hairpin loops are located on separate RNA molecules, their intermolecular interaction is called a kissing complex. These interactions generally form between stem-loops. However, stable complexes have been observed containing only two intermolecular
Watson–Crick base pairs.

Biological significance

RNA molecules perform their function in living cells by adopting specific and highly complex 3-dimensional structures. It is believed that recombination may be initiated by the kissing loops. Recombination is critical to successful evolution, especially in the adaptation and survival of viruses. Furthermore, the kissing complex is composed of two hairpin loops that function as a regulator of CoLE1 plasmid in the E.Coli bacteria. This regulation happens when the antisense RNA of E.Coli and RNA primer responsible for DNA replication hybridizes to form the kissing complex.

In retroviruses 
Retroviruses are viruses that are very similar in structure, which allows them to silently replicate inside a host, keeping it alive until the replication is completed and the host is no longer needed. The genomic RNA of retroviruses is linked non-covalently to the dimer linkage structure (DLS), a non-coding region in the 5' UTR. For the kissing loop interaction to occur, there is a triple interaction that involves a 5'-flanking purine and 2 centralized bases in the complementary strand. This interaction transcripts in the major groove of the kissing loop dimer.

The human immunodeficiency virus (HIV) is a retrovirus that can be transmitted via the interactions of bodily fluids. There are two types of HIV viruses, human immunodeficiency virus type 1 (HIV-1) and  human immunodeficiency virus type 2 (HIV-2). From the two types of the Human Immunodeficiency Virus strain, HIV-1 is the most common strain. The RNA of the HIV-1 virus uses the kissing stem loop interaction as a means of recognition, the main step of interaction of the dimerization initiation site (DIS) to form the duplex. To study the kissing stem-loop loop interaction, It was seen that the Dimerization initiation site (DIS) complex was essential to the replication of the HIV type 1 virus in the eukaryotic cell, and any changed to the stem loop structure diminished the dimerization interaction. Experimentally, it has been seen that, in vivo, mutating the Dimerization initiation site (DIS) obstructed the dimerization of the DIS complex.

See also 
 Stem-loop
 Pseudoknot
 RNA
 Nucleic acid tertiary structure
 Three prime untranslated region
 Adaptation

References

Further reading

External links 
 

Cis-regulatory RNA elements
Retroviridae